Dawn Marie Hadley  (born 1967) is a British historian and archaeologist, who is best known for her research on the Anglo-Saxon and Viking-Age periods, the study of childhood, and gender in medieval England. She is a member of the Centre for Medieval Studies and the department of archaeology at the University of York.

Biography

Education and career
Born in Walsall, Hadley studied Modern History at the Universities of Hull and Birmingham. 
She was a temporary lecturer in History at the University of Leeds. In 1996, Hadley was hired by the University of Sheffield as a lecturer. From 2009 to 2018, Hadley was a professor at the University. She served as Faculty Director of Post-Graduate Studies from 2009 to 2013. She was promoted to Head of Department in 2014. She also was Acting Vice-President for Arts and Humanities at the University from 2017 to 2018.

Hadley joined the University of York in 2018. She has written several publications on Anglo-Saxon culture and society and Viking-Age history. Her primary research focus is the study of childhood, gender, migration, and funerary rituals. Hadley is Director of White Rose College of Arts and Humanities, Universities of Leeds, Sheffield, and York.

Current research

Hadley's most recent research includes contributions to The Rothwell Charnel Chapel Project, the Sheffield Castle project and Tents to Towns: the Viking Great Army and its Legacy project. Hadley, along with Dr Jennifer Crangle and Dr Elizabeth Craig-Atkins (University of Sheffield), led the Rothwell Charnel Chapel Project’, which focuses on the 13th century charnel chapel at Holy Trinity Church, in Rothwell, Northamptonshire. The below-ground chapel house contains one of two remaining medieval ossuaries in England.

Hadley co-directs the "Viking Torksey project" on the 9th century Viking winter camp at Torksey, Lincolnshire with Prof. Julian Richards, and its extension Tents to Towns. Building on the late Mark Blackburn's identification and characterisation of the site, the new project focused on the legacy of the Viking army in the area, its interaction with the local community, the development of Anglo-Saxon towns, and the changing nature of commerce during the Anglo-Saxon period at Torksey. Hadley has co-authored a new book with Prof. John Moreland (University of Sheffield) on Sheffield Castle, which was destroyed (slighted) during the English Civil War. The book is based on the research project led by Hadley and Moreland on previous excavations of the castle site.

Media
From 1998 to 2010, Hadley appeared on five episodes of the British TV series, Time Team. She also appeared as herself in the  TV Movie Documentary, Saxon Hoard: A Golden Discovery in 2012.

Awards and honours
In November, 2006, Hadley was elected a Fellow of the Society of Antiquaries of London.

Selected publications

Books (authored)

Books (editor)

Journal papers

Excavation reports and archives
Hadley has directed or co-directed excavations and projects bringing together the findings of legacy archives and has made available the archives and reports of such projects including the following:
Sheffield Castle (South Yorkshire): https://archaeologydataservice.ac.uk/archives/view/sheffieldcastle_uos_2020/
Sheffield Manor Lodge (South Yorkshire): https://archaeologydataservice.ac.uk/archives/view/1003816/downloads.cfm?group=2354
Torksey (Lincolnshire): https://doi.org/10.5284/1018222
West Halton (Lincolnshire): https://eprints.whiterose.ac.uk/143182/

References

External links
Virtual reality brings ninth century Viking invaders' camp to life
Public Engagement Public engagement case study: Theatre collaborations with Professor Dawn Hadley
Rare English charnel house can now be seen online

1967 births
British archaeologists
British women archaeologists
Medievalists
Fellows of the Society of Antiquaries of London
Living people
Medieval archaeologists